Merate is a municipality of 14,872 inhabitants in the province of Lecco, in the northern Italian region of Lombardy. It is served by Cernusco-Merate railway station.

History 

The name Melatum appeared for the first time in the 4th century; it may be derived from the Greek for black/gloomy/dark because of the presence of woods, or from the Italian for apple (mela): an important fruit from the region.

During the fighting between the Torriani and the Visconti families for the supremacy of Milan, Merate (in particular the castle) suffered considerable damage. It recovered during the 17th century after being decimated by the plague; finally becoming one of the richest towns of the region, after Lecco.

At the beginning of the 16th century an academic institute was constructed: at the end of the 18th century the young writer/poet Alessandro Manzoni studied at this school, and after his death the school took on his name.

After the unification of Italy Merate grew as an industrial centre with the development of the banking and textile industries. At the end of the 19th century it became one of the first Italian towns to have electricity, gas and piped drinking water.

The interwar period saw considerable development of the mechanical and textile industries.

In 1926 the astronomical observatory was constructed, and in the same year the municipality was
enlarged, incorporating many neighbouring communities.

Industry continued to increase after the Second World War. The population passed to 9,000 inhabitants in 1951, and is 14,000 today. Merate received the honorary title of city with a presidential decree in 1991.

Main sights
Palazzo Prinetti (18th century), with a high cylindrical tower
Villa Confalonieri (late 19th century)
Villa Baslini
Villa Belvedere
Villa "Il Mombello"
Villa "Il Subaglio"
The Santctuary of Madonna del Bosco (17th century), housing a Deposition by Domenico Campi.

Astronomical observatory 

Starting from the end 19th century light pollution from Milan disturbed the activities of the Brera astronomical observatory. However, the idea to construct a new observatory outside the City was not realized until the 1920s with the acquisition of the villa San Rocco: this used to be a Capuchin monastery before becoming a private villa and then a psychiatric clinic following the First World War.

Today Brianza is one of the most densely populated regions of Italy and the light pollution is considerable. Nonetheless, the observatory is still used for research activities (leader in the production of X-ray optics), as well as course- and thesis-work for the students of Milan University.

Twinned towns 

  Buzançais, France
  Kappeln, Germany

Mayors of Merate from 1860 (from municipality website) 
1860 - 1861 Federico Sala 
1861 - 1864 Berengario Barbiano di Belgiojoso
1864 - 1870 Luigi Prinetti 
1870 - 1886 Carlo Cornaggia 
1887 - 1893 Vitale Bianchi 
1893 - 1899 Antonio Baslini 
1900 - 1905 Giambattista Colombo 
1905 - 1920 Carlo Baslini 
1920 - 1922 Mario Bevilacqua 
1922 - 1923 Alessandro Tettamanti 
1924 - 1925 Carlo Baslini 
1926 - 1943 Carlo Baslini (podestà)
1945 - 1946 Gerolamo Bonfanti Palazzi 
1946 - 1946 Alessandro Tettamanti 
1946 - 1960 Mario Sala 
1960 - 1964 Enrico Ferrario 
1964 - 1975 Luigi Zappa 
1975 - 1985 Giuseppe Ghezzi 
1985 - 1990 Giacomo Romerio 
1990 - 1995 Mario Gallina
1995 - 2004 Dario Perego
2004 - 2009 Giovanni Battista Albani

External links 
 Brera astronomical observatory, Merate
 Merate on line

Cities and towns in Lombardy
Populated places on Brianza